Karpov is a surname. Notable people with the surname include:

 Aleksandr Karpov, Soviet ace, double Hero of the Soviet Union
 Anatoly Karpov (born 1951), Russian chess grandmaster, Undisputed World Chess Champion 1975–85, and FIDE World Chess Champion 1993–99
 Dmitriy Karpov (born 1981), athlete from Kazakhstan
 Elena Karpova (born 1980), basketball player
 Lev Iakovlevich Karpov (1879–1921), Russian Chemist and Bolshevik revolutionary
 Sergey Karpov (born 1948), Russian historian
 Valeri Karpov (born 1971), retired ice hockey player
 Vladimir Karpov (1922–2010), soldier and writer
 Vladimir Karpov (politician) (1948–2015), Russian politician

See also 
 90414 Karpov, a main-belt asteroid
 Maryamah Karpov, the fourth series of Andrea Hirata's tetralogy Laskar Pelangi

Russian-language surnames